Ercilla is a Chilean town and commune in the Malleco Province, Araucanía Region. Its name is a tribute to Alonso de Ercilla, who wrote La Araucana.

Demographics
Of these, 3,238 (35.8%) lived in urban areas and 5,803 (64.2%) in rural areas. Between the 1992 and 2002 censuses, the population grew by 2.3% (199 persons).

Administration
As a commune, Ercilla is a third-level administrative division of Chile administered by a municipal council, headed by an alcalde who is directly elected every four years. The 2008-2012 alcalde is Ramón Vilches Álvarez (Ind.).

Within the electoral divisions of Chile, Ercilla is represented in the Chamber of Deputies by Gonzalo Arenas (UDI) and Mario Venegas (PDC) as part of the 48th electoral district, together with Angol, Renaico, Collipulli, Los Sauces, Purén, Lumaco and Traiguén. The commune is represented in the Senate by Alberto Espina Otero (RN) and Jaime Quintana Leal (PPD) as part of the 14th senatorial constituency (Araucanía-North).

References 

Communes of Chile
Populated places in Malleco Province